Eddy Yusof (born 2 October 1994) is a Swiss male artistic gymnast and a member of the national team. He participated at the 2015 World Artistic Gymnastics Championships in Glasgow, and qualified for the 2016 Summer Olympics.

References

External links 
 

1994 births
Living people
Swiss male artistic gymnasts
People from Bülach
Gymnasts at the 2016 Summer Olympics
Olympic gymnasts of Switzerland
People from Pfäffikon, Zürich
Gymnasts at the 2020 Summer Olympics
Sportspeople from the canton of Zürich
21st-century Swiss people